Alliance Sociale was a left-wing political coalition in Mauritius. It consisted of the Mauritian Labour Party, Mauritian Party of Xavier-Luc Duval, The Greens, Republican Movement and the Mauritian Militant Socialist Movement.

The Alliance won 38 of the 70 parliamentary seats in the general election of July 2005, and formed the government with Navin Ramgoolam as Prime Minister. Ramgoolam had previously held the office from 1995 to 2000.

Political parties in Mauritius